Rita-Maria Nowotny (1 June 1925 – 9 September 2000) was a German actress. She was married to Fritz Genschow and appeared in a series of films directed by him in the 1950s which were based on stories by the Brothers Grimm.

Selected filmography
 Little Red Riding Hood (1953)
 Hansel and Gretel (1954)
 Mother Holly (1954)
 The Wishing-Table (1956)
 The Goose Girl (1957)

References

Bibliography
 Goble, Alan. The Complete Index to Literary Sources in Film. Walter de Gruyter, 1999.

External links

1925 births
2000 deaths
German film actresses